Vladimír Zedník (born 1 February 1947) is a former professional tennis player who represented Czechoslovakia. In 1975, he was a member of the Czechoslovak team which lost 3–2 in the final of the Davis Cup to the Swedish team led by Björn Borg. During his career Zedník won two singles and four doubles titles.

Career finals

Singles (2 titles, 3 runner-ups)

Doubles (4 titles, 4 runner-ups)

References

External links 

 
 
 
 Vladimir Zednik at australianopen.com

1947 births
Living people
Czech male tennis players
Czechoslovak male tennis players
Tennis players from Prague